Indiana Marie Ella Massara (born 23 August 2002), sometimes shortened to just Indiana, is an Australian singer, actress, model, and Internet personality. Massara has been named one of Kiss FM's youngest New Next Up Artists.

Early life and education
Massara was born in Coolbinia, a suburb of Perth, Western Australia. She is of Italian descent. Massara was a "tom-boy" as a child with an interest in sports. She initially stayed in Australia with her grandparents while her parents and older brother Presley left for Los Angeles so he could pursue acting. Indiana attended Mercedes College in the City of Perth before making the decision to join them.

Career
Massara walked the Los Angeles Fashion Week runway at the age of 13.

Massara began working with Brat in 2017 when she landed the role of Rooney Forrester in Chicken Girls, a character she would also play in various series and films for the network such as Attaway Appeal, Chicken Girls: The Movie, Holiday Spectacular, Intern-in-Chief, the lead in Rooney's Last Roll, as well as cameos in Total Eclipse and Stuck. She also hosted Brat Chat alongside Darius Marcell and performed the theme song for Red Ruby, "Run You Down".

Massara released her debut single, "Drama" featuring Stoppa, in 2017, which made it into the top ten chart on Radio Disney. She has been in the top three on Radio Disney multiple times as well as receiving radio play in the United States, Australia, and Canada. Massara has released several singles including "Smoke In My Eyes", "In Your Dreams", "Do Yourself A Favour" and "Apology" featuring 24hrs in 2018 and "That Day", "I Think We're Alone Now" in 2019, and "Squeeze" in 2020. As of 2018, she was working on an EP.

In October 2018, Massara went on her first ever tour alongside Tayler Holder, Zach Clayton, and Joey Birlem with Swipe Up Live in Australia. Massara opened for Why Don't We, Bryce Vine, and Ava Max at 103.7 KISS-FM's Kiss the Summer Hello in June 2019.

In June 2020, Massara started a podcast with her friends Zach Justice and Jared "JareBear" Bailey titled Dropouts. A number of public figures have featured on the podcast as guests, such as Josh Peck, Brighton Sharbino, Paris Berelc, Nick Turturro, and Mike E. Winfield. In 2022, Massara joined the Broken Road podcast.

Massara played Paige in the 2021 film Hero Mode. She has an upcoming role as Jess in The Crusades. As of December 2022, she has 1.9 million and 4.9 followers on Instagram and TikTok respectively.

Artistry
Massara takes inspiration from Sza, Khalid, Jack & Jack, and Beyonce. Her early inspirations include Elvis Presley and Frank Sinatra.

Discography

Singles
 "Drama" featuring Stoppa (2017) 
 "Smoke in my Eyes" (2018)
 "Do Yourself a Favour" (2018)
 "In Your Dreams" (2018)
 "Apology" featuring 24hrs (2018)
 "I Think We're Alone Now" (2019)
 "That Day" (2019)
 "Over It" (2019) with Jules LeBlanc and Aliyah Moulden
 "Run You Down" (2019), Red Ruby theme song
 "Say It Back" (2019)
 "Squeeze" (2020)
 "Brainstorm" (2021) from Hero Mode

Music videos

Filmography

Film and television

Web

References

 https://podcasts.apple.com/us/podcast/broken-road/id1581168155

External links
 

Living people
2002 births
21st-century Australian actresses
21st-century Australian women singers
Actresses from Perth, Western Australia
Australian child actresses
Australian child models
Australian child singers
Australian expatriates in the United States
Australian Internet celebrities
Australian people of Italian descent
Australian web series actresses
Australian women pop singers
Models from Perth, Western Australia
Female models from Western Australia